was a Japanese noble and scholar of the Nara period. He was the son of sadaijin Isonokami no Maro.

Life 

In 739 he was charged with an affair with Kume no Wakame, the wife of Fujiwara no Umakai, and exiled to Tosa Province.

In 749, he was made chūnagon. He was also appointed in 746 as an envoy to Tang China, but the mission was cancelled. The planned objectives of the mission are supposed to have been to check Silla, with which Japan's relations were strained, and to import gold.

In 750, Otomaro died.

Genealogy 

Father: Isonokami no Maro
Mother: Unknown
Wife: Unknown
Son: Isonokami no Yakatsugu
Son:

References 

750 deaths
People of Nara-period Japan
Year of birth unknown